Zabivaka was the official mascot of the 2018 FIFA World Cup, which was held in Russia. The name is a blend of the Russian words собака ("dog") and забивать ("to strike").

Designed by student designer Ekaterina Bocharova, the mascot was selected by internet voting in Russia.

In pre-World Cup events, the mascot was played by English YouTuber and actor Rafe Young.

Design
The mascot was unveiled on 21 October 2016. It represents an anthropomorphic Eurasian wolf (Canis lupus lupus) with brown and white fur, wearing a T-shirt emblazoned with the words "RUSSIA 2018" and orange goggles — according to the designer, these are not ski goggles, but sports goggles like those used in cycling: "Zabivaka is so fast on the field that he needs eye protection". 

The combination of white, blue and red T-shirt and shorts are the national colours of the Russian team.

Competition
The competition results were announced on 22 October 2016, in the Evening Urgant on the Channel One Russia. The Wolf, named Zabivaka, scored 53% of the votes, ahead of the Tiger (27%) and the Cat (20%). More than one million people participated in the voting, which took place during September 2016 at FIFA.com, as well as before an during the live show of the Evening Urgant, where the results of the competition were announced. 

The name was suggested at the show by the chairman of the World Cup 2018 Organising Committee Vitali Mutko. FIFA paid Bocharova $500.

See also
 FIFA World Cup mascots
 2014 Winter Olympic and Paralympic Games mascots
 Zoich
 Misha
 Vučko
 2018 World cup
 FIFA World Cup

References

External links

 FIFA's official webpage on Zabivaka

2018 FIFA World Cup
Fictional wolves
Russian mascots
FIFA World Cup mascots
Mascots introduced in 2016